Xanthoparmelia subramigera is a lichen which belongs to the Xanthoparmelia genus.

Description 
Grows to around 4-12 cm in diameter with irregularly lobate lobes which are approximately 1.5-4 mm wide. The upper surface of the lichen is yellow-green with a smooth and shiny surface while the lower surface is often pale or medium brown in color.

Habitat and range 
The lichen has a wide global range including Africa, North and South America,the Caribbean, Japan, and Oceania. Interestingly this species can be found in very isolated locations such as Ascension Island and St Helena Island in the Atlantic Ocean and the mountains of North Korea.

See also 

 List of Xanthoparmelia species

References 

subramigera
Lichen species